Alfonso Reyes Cabanás (born September 19, 1971) is a retired Spanish professional basketball player. Reyes finished his club playing career with the Spanish club Leche Río Breogán.

Professional career
During his pro career, Reyes won the two Spanish King's Cup tournaments (1992, 2000), and he was named the MVP of the 2000 tournament. He announced his retirement from playing professional basketball in May 2007.

National team career
Reyes played with the senior Spanish national basketball team at the following major FIBA tournaments: the 1995 EuroBasket, the 1997 EuroBasket, the 1998 FIBA World Cup, the 1999 EuroBasket, the 2000 Sydney Summer Olympics, the 2001 EuroBasket, the 2002 FIBA World Cup, and the 2003 EuroBasket.

With Spain, he won a silver medal at the 1999 EuroBasket, a bronze medal at the 2001 EuroBasket, and a silver medal at the 2003 EuroBasket.

Post-playing career
After he retired from playing professional club basketball, Reyes became a civil engineer. He also served as the President of the Spanish Basketball Men's Player's Union (ABP).

Personal life
Reyes' younger brother, Felipe, is also a professional basketball player.

Awards and accomplishments

Clubs
 2× Spanish King's Cup Winner with Adecco Estudiantes (1992, 2000)
 2× Spanish Cup winner (1992, 2000)
 6× Spanish League All-Star (1995, 1996, 1998, 1999, 2001, 2002)
 2× Spanish All-Star Game MVP (1998, 2001)

Spanish senior national team
 EuroBasket 1999: 
 EuroBasket 2001: 
 EuroBasket 2003:

References

External links
Euroleague.net Profile
ACB.com Profile 
FIBA Archive Profile
FIBA Europe Profile

1971 births
Living people
1998 FIBA World Championship players
2002 FIBA World Championship players
Baloncesto Málaga players
Basketball players at the 2000 Summer Olympics
CB Breogán players
CB Estudiantes players
Centers (basketball)
Liga ACB players
Olympic basketball players of Spain
Paris Racing Basket players
Real Madrid Baloncesto players
Spanish men's basketball players